Galium paschale is a species of flowering plant in the genus Galium found in south-eastern Europe and Turkey.

Distribution and ecology
Galium paschale grows wild in parts of Bulgaria, Greece, the former Yugoslavia and Turkey. In Turkey, it ranges from Turkish Thrace in the west to Bitlis Province in the east, and lives in mixed deciduous woodland.

Taxonomy
Galium paschale was first described by the Swedish botanist Peter Forsskål in his 1775 work .

References

paschale
Flora of Southeastern Europe
Plants described in 1775